The Bader-Jaquette and Westwang Houses and Rental Property in 46 and 36 5th Ave. W. in Kalispell, Montana was listed on the National Register of Historic Places in 1994.  The listing included three contributing buildings.

According to the NRHP nomination,The two-story Bader/Jaquette House has typical Queen Anne features including the hipped roof with lower cross gable, the pent roof enclosing the front gable, the recessed second-floor porch, the full front porch, the two-story cutaway bay windows on the front gable, the stained glass and leaded glass windows, the pediment at the entry, the two-story bay window on the south, and the varied siding (wood shingles on the second floor and clapboard on the first floor).
The Bader/Jaquette House was built in 1903 by carpenter and lumber retailer Elmer Bader.

References

Residential buildings on the National Register of Historic Places in Montana
Queen Anne architecture in Montana
Residential buildings completed in 1903
Houses in Flathead County, Montana
Kalispell, Montana
1903 establishments in Montana